Lobophora montanata is a species of geometrid moth in the family Geometridae. It is found in North America.

The MONA or Hodges number for Lobophora montanata is 7641.

References

Further reading

 
 

Larentiinae
Articles created by Qbugbot
Moths described in 1874